The Alternative Miss Ireland (AMI) was an annual gay event which took place in Dublin, Ireland, on the Sunday closest to St. Patrick's Day, 17 March. It occurred over three-and-a-half hours and featured a pastiche of the beauty pageant rounds inspired by Andrew Logan's Alternative Miss World, with day-wear, swimwear and evening-wear rounds. It is commonly shortened to AMI, both as its initials and a wordplay on the French for "friend". It began in 1987 and ended in 2012.

The event promotional material states: "Alternative Miss Ireland (AMI) is an annual beauty pageant that is open to men, women and animals. It is also a non-profit collective dedicated to raising money for Irish HIV/AIDS organisations (over €235,000.00 raised since 1996)."

It features on the front cover each year of the March issue of Gay Community News magazine and is the highlight of Ireland's calendar of gay-themed events. Coverage by mainstream news media is muted, possibly because it clashes with reporting of St. Patrick's Day, with occasional pieces in The Irish Times, and a documentary A Bit of the Other commissioned by RTÉ television.

History
The first contest was held in Sides nightclub on Dame Street on 1 April 1987, followed by a hiatus until it began again in its present form during the mid-1990s. Upon recommencement, it was held in The Red Box, POD for the first few years. It switched to the Olympia Theatre in 2000 to accommodate its increasing popularity. It is a fund-raising event for HIV/AIDS charities such as Cáirde and St. James's Hospital. Although open to any entrant (a dog was once a contestant), it features mainly gay-themed entrants and is commonly known as Gay Christmas since its host, Panti, used that term regularly in her opening routines.

It features entries from heats around Ireland including Alternative Miss Cork, Alternative Miss Limerick, Alternative Miss Philippines (from a Philippines community in Ireland) and the rest of the approximately ten contestants enter directly.

In 1998, Miss Veda Beaux Reves, who had just lost first place to Miss Tampy Lilette, allegedly threw her Golden Briquette trophy at the judges in a tantrum. At the 2007 contest, the host Panti was surprised by a message from her hero Dolly Parton. It is traditional that the previous year's winner does a new performance after the interval, as Miss Heidi Konnt did in 2006.

There is a large production team involved, known as the Alternative Miss Ireland Family. It was reported in October 2011 that the final pageant would take place in 2012. One organiser said, "people have less time to pull everything together".

Critic Fintan Walsh has written about the contest in the article 'Homleysexuality and the 'Beauty' Pageant' (2009).

Winners
 1987 Miss Isle – Alternative Miss Ireland I
 1996 Miss Tress – Alternative Miss Ireland II
 1997 Miss Shirley Temple Bar – Alternative Miss Ireland III
 1998 Miss Tampy Lilette – Alternative Miss Ireland IV
 1999 Miss Veda Beaux Reves – Alternative Miss Ireland V
 2000 Miss Siobhán Broadway – Alternative Miss Ireland VI
 2001 Miss Tina Leggs Tantrum – Alternative Miss Ireland VII
 2002 Miss Sid Viscous – Alternative Miss Ireland VIII
 2003 Miss Alter Ego – Alternative Miss Ireland IX
 2004 Miss Twirly Chassy – Alternative Miss Ireland X
 2005 Miss Heidi Konnt – Alternative Miss Ireland XI
 2006 Miss Funtime Gustavo – Alternative Miss Ireland XII
 2007 Joanna Ryde – Alternative Miss Ireland XIII
 2008 Sheila Fits-Patrick – Alternative Miss Ireland XIV
 2009 Miss Smilin' Kanker – Alternative Miss Ireland XV
 2010 Miss Peaches Queen – Alternative Miss Ireland XV
 2011 Miss Mangina Jones – Alternative Miss Ireland XVII
 2012 Miss Minnie Mélange – Alternative Miss Ireland XVIII

List of past judges
 Twink
 Van Morrison
 Anna Nolan
 Louis Walsh
 Katherine Lynch
 Tonie Walsh
 Linda Martin
 Marc Almond
 Gert Jonkers
 Brendan Courtney
 Dorothy Cross
 Maria Doyle Kennedy
 Brenda Fricker
 Nell McCafferty
 Michelle Rocca
 Agnes Bernelle
 Senators David Norris and Ivana Bacik
 The Rubberbandits
 Bourgeois & Maurice

See also
 Panti
 Shirley Temple Bar

References

Bibliography

External links
 

Beauty pageants in Ireland
Recurring events established in 1987
Irish awards